Lexin is an online Swedish and Norwegian lexicon that can translate between Swedish or Norwegian and a number of other languages. Its original use was to help immigrants translate between their native languages and Swedish, but at least the English-Swedish-English lexicons are so complete that many Swedes use them for everyday use.

Swedish
The Swedish lexicons are now called Folkets lexikon (The People's Dictionary) and support bidirectional translation between Swedish and: 
  
 Albanian 
 Arabic 
 Bosnian 
 Croatian 

 English
 Finnish 
 Greek 
 Kurdish (Kurmanji & Sorani)
 Russian 

 Serbian 
 Somali 
 Spanish 
 Turkish

References

External links
 The People's Dictionary (formerly Lexin)  
 Folkets lexikon (formerly Lexin)  
 Lexin  
 Lexin  
 Lexin  

Norwegian dictionaries
Swedish dictionaries
Swedish websites